In developmental biology and zoology, defeminization is an aspect of the process of sexual differentiation by which a potential female-specific structure, function, or behavior is changed by one of the processes of male development. Although the term might seem to imply "removal" of female characteristics, in nearly all biological contexts it refers to prevention of an aspect of female development from manifesting.

In human biology of gender, the best known example of this is the prevention of development of the müllerian duct derivatives by anti-müllerian hormone (AMH) in the 3rd and 4th months of fetal development, though the term is not commonly used in discussions of human development.

In a number of non-human mammals, there is evidence that hormones produced by the testes act directly on the brain to prevent development of female characteristics, especially female reproductive behavior.

In humans, defeminization may be triggered by loss of estrogens or by increased androgens. Symptoms may include breast atrophy, loss of gynoid fat distribution, and other physical defeminizing changes. Defeminization may occur with the menopause, with transmasculine hormone therapy (testosterone administration), and with administration of androgens and anabolic steroids to cisgender women (e.g., for performance enhancement or for treatment of breast cancer).

See also

 Sexual differentiation
 Defeminization and masculinization
 Virilization
 Feminization

References

Sexual anatomy
Zoology
Physiology